The 2002 United States state legislative elections were held on November 5, 2002, halfway through President George W. Bush's first term in office. This was a unique election in which the incumbent Republican party performed surprisingly well for a midterm election. Elections were held for 91 legislative chambers, with all states but Louisiana, Mississippi, New Jersey, and Virginia holding elections in at least one house.  Three territorial chambers in two territories and the District of Columbia were up as well.

Republicans flipped control of six chambers: the Colorado Senate, the Georgia House of Representatives for the first time since Reconstruction, the Missouri House of Representatives for the first time since 1955, the Texas House of Representatives for the first time since Reconstruction, the Washington Senate, and the Wisconsin Senate. Meanwhile, Democrats flipped control of the Illinois Senate. Additionally, the Arizona Senate went from a Democratic-led coalition to Republican control. The Maine Senate went from an evenly divided power-sharing government to a Democratic one. while the Oregon Senate went from Republican to tied.

Republicans had initially won control of the North Carolina House of Representatives by one seat, but Republican Michael P. Decker switched parties to become a Democrat, producing a tied chamber.

As a result, Republicans held a majority of state legislative seats for the first time in half a century.

Summary table
Regularly-scheduled elections were held in 91 of the 99 state legislative chambers in the United States. Nationwide, regularly-scheduled elections were held for 6,381 of the 7,383 legislative seats. Many legislative chambers held elections for all seats, but some legislative chambers that use staggered elections held elections for only a portion of the total seats in the chamber. The chambers not up for election either hold regularly-scheduled elections in odd-numbered years, or have four-year terms and hold all regularly-scheduled elections in presidential midterm election years.

Note that this table only covers regularly-scheduled elections; additional special elections took place concurrently with these regularly-scheduled elections.

Results

State-by-state

Upper houses

Lower houses

Results

Territorial chambers

Lower houses

Unicameral

Notes

References

 
 
State legislative elections
State legislature elections in the United States by year